Margaret MacDonald, Macdonald or McDonald may refer to:

Margaret MacDonald (visionary) (1815 – c. 1840), Scottish charismatic
Margaret Macdonald Mackintosh (1865–1933), Scottish artist
Margaret Ethel MacDonald (1870–1911), British feminist, social reformer, and wife of Labour politician Ramsay MacDonald
Margaret MacDonald (nurse) (1873–1948), Canadian nurse
Margaret MacDonald (philosopher) (1907–1956), British philosopher
Margaret Mary Macdonald (1910–1968), Canadian politician
Margaret MacDonald (politician) (born 1951), American politician
Maggie Macdonald (1952–2016), Scottish singer
Maggie MacDonald (born 1978), Canadian writer and musician
Margaret McDonald (voice actress) (born 1988), American voice actress
Margaret Read MacDonald (born 1940), American storyteller, folklorist, and author of children's books
Margaret Evangeline McDonald, ambassador to the United States from the Bahamas